Chen Chien-jen (born 11 August 1939) is a Taiwanese diplomat.

Political career
Chen served in the Legislative Yuan for one term from 1993 to 1996. He was then named the minister of the Government Information Office in 1998. The next year, he was appointed to lead the Ministry of Foreign Affairs. Chen planned to retire after stepping down at the end of President Lee Teng-hui's final term in 2000. However, Lee's successor Chen Shui-bian asked Chen Chien-jen to reconsider. Chen eventually chose to accept the post of representative to the United States. He postponed retirement again in 2004 to become the representative to the European Union and Belgium. Chen was succeeded by Michael Kau in July 2006.

During Hung Hsiu-chu's 2016 presidential campaign, Chen was one of her diplomatic advisers.

References

1939 births
Living people
Republic of China politicians from Shanghai
Taiwanese Ministers of Foreign Affairs
Representatives of Taiwan to Belgium
Members of the 2nd Legislative Yuan
Kuomintang Members of the Legislative Yuan in Taiwan
Taiwanese people from Shanghai
Chinese Civil War refugees
Party List Members of the Legislative Yuan
Representatives of Taiwan to the European Union
Representatives of Taiwan to the United States